Panamacebus is an extinct genus of monkey known from the Early Miocene (Hemingfordian in the NALMA classification) of central Panama. Panamacebus transitus is the only and type species of this genus.

Description 
Together with Paralouatta marianae from Cuba, it is the oldest known New World monkey of North America. Fossils of Panamacebus, a left upper first molar and lower premolar, were uncovered from the Las Cascadas Formation, of which tuffs were analyzed providing an age of 20.93 ± 0.17 Ma, of the Panama Canal Zone.

See also 

 List of fossil primates of Central and South America

References

Bibliography 
 
 
 
 

?†Panamacebus
Prehistoric primate genera
Aquitanian life
Hemingfordian
Neogene Panama
Fossils of Panama
Panama Canal Zone
Fossil taxa described in 2016